The Khatmiyya is a Sufi order or tariqa founded by Sayyid Mohammed Uthman al-Mirghani al-Khatim.
The Khatmiyya is the largest Sufi order in Sudan, Eritrea and Ethiopia. It also has followers in Egypt, Chad, Saudi Arabia, Somalia, Uganda, Yemen and India.

It was established by Sayyid Mohammed Uthman al-Mirghani al-Khatim, the grandson of Al-Sayyid Abdullahi Al-Mirghani Al-Mahjoob who was the Imam of Al-Haram mosque in Mecca and the Mufti.

It was established as an amalgamation of five other orders which are: Naqshbandiyya, Qadiriyya, Shazaliyya, Junaidiyya and Mirghaniyya. Mirghaniyya having been already established by Al-Sayyid or Abdullahi Al-Mirghani Al-Mahjoub.

Al-Sayyid Al-Khatim was born in At-Ta'if in Hijaz and buried in Mecca in Tihamah. He started his travels at the age of twenty five after gaining his education through a number of prominent Islamic scholars in Mecca of his time among whom was Sayyid Ahmad Ibn Idris al-Fasi.

His lineage goes back to the Islamic prophet Muhammad through his grandson the noble Al-Sayyid Al-Hussain as specified in the famous book of Ajayib Al-Athar by Al-Jabarti.

He spent a significant amount of time in Sudan, Eritrea, Egypt and Ethiopia where he lived with the local communities and played a significant role in introducing the Arabic language and the teachings of the religion of Islam to the people of these areas in an organised structure at a time when many of these communities were largely isolated and lacked organised education.

Among his accomplishments was the precedence of establishing the first school for the education of women in the Horn of Africa.

He was a man of extraordinary linguistic ability and knowledge of the sciences of both Shari'a and Haqiqa as praised by his scholars as well as an extensive knowledge of the Abrahamic religions (some of which were already practised when he arrived in Ethiopia and Egypt). These abilities allowed him to write over 30 books and articles. His writings included an explanation of the verses of the Quran in his book Taj Al-Tafaseer, a concise and immaculate description of the story of the birth of the prophet Muhammad Al-Asrar Al-Rabaniya and over 112 literary poems on the description of the attributes and praise of the prophet Muhammad.

References

Sufi orders